MultiDark (MULTImessenger Approach for DARK Matter Detection) is a Spanish project, with a stated goal of contributing to the identification and detection of dark matter.

History
The project is a grouping effort, involving many researchers in the Spanish community with a special interest in dark matter. It began on 17 December 2009 and is funded for five years. The project is supported by Consolider-Ingenio, a programme of the Ministry of Economy and Finance.

Goals
To analyse in detail the most plausible candidates for dark matter.
To investigate how they form the dark halos that are believed to surround galaxies.
To contribute to the development of experiments to detect dark matter.

References

Further reading
 
  Invited talk at the 36th COSPAR Scientific Assembly, Beijing, China, 16–23 July 2006

External links
 Multimessenger Approach for Dark Matter Detection. Spanish Project of the Consolider-Ingenio 2010 Programme

Experiments for dark matter search